The energy policy of Australia is subject to the regulatory and fiscal influence of all three levels of government in Australia, although only the State and Federal levels determine policy for primary industries such as coal. Federal policies for energy in Australia continue to support the coal mining and natural gas industries through subsidies for fossil fuel use and production. Australia is the 10th most coal-dependent country in the world. Coal and natural gas, along with oil-based products, are currently the primary sources of Australian energy usage and the coal industry produces over 30% of Australia's total greenhouse gas emissions. In 2018 Australia was the 8th highest emitter of greenhouse gases per capita in the world.

Australia's energy policy features a combination of coal power stations and hydro electricity plants. The Australian government has decided not to build nuclear power plants, although it is one of the world's largest producers of uranium.

Electricity generation

History and governance
After World War II, New South Wales and Victoria started connecting the formerly small and self-contained local and regional power grids into statewide grids run centrally by public statutory authorities.  Similar developments occurred in other states. Both of the industrially large states cooperated with the Commonwealth in the development and interconnection of the Snowy Mountains Scheme.

Rapid economic growth led to large and expanding construction programs of coal-fired power stations such as black coal in New South Wales and brown coal in Victoria. By the 1980s complex policy questions had emerged involving the massive requirements for investment, land and water.

Between 1981 and 1983 a cascade of blackouts and disruptions was triggered in both states, resulting from generator design failures in New South Wales, industrial disputes in Victoria, and drought in the storages of the Snowy system (which provided essential peak power to the State systems). Wide political controversy arose from this and from proposals to the New South Wales Government from the Electricity Commission of New South Wales for urgent approval to build large new stations at Mardi and Olney on the Central Coast, and at other sites later.

The Commission of Enquiry into Electricity Generation Planning in New South Wales was established, reporting in mid-1985. This was the first independent enquiry directed from outside the industry into the Australian electricity system. It found, among other matters, that existing power stations were very inefficient, that plans for four new stations, worth then about $12 billion, should be abandoned, and that if the sector were restructured there should be sufficient capacity for normal purposes until the early years of the 21st century. This forecast was achieved. The Commission also recommended enhanced operational coordination of the adjoining State systems and the interconnection in eastern Australia of regional power markets.

The New South Wales Enquiry marked the beginning of the end of the centralised power utility monopolies and established the direction of a new trajectory in Australian energy policy, towards decentralisation, interconnection of States and the use of markets for coordination. Similar enquiries were subsequently established in Victoria (by the Parliament) and elsewhere, and during the 1990s the industry was comprehensively restructured in southeastern Australia and subsequently corporatised.

Following the report by the Industry Commission on the sector moves towards a national market developed. The impetus towards system-wide competition was encouraged by the Hilmer recommendations. The establishment of the National Electricity Market in 1997 was the first major accomplishment of the new Federal/State cooperative arrangements under the Council of Australian Governments. The governance provisions included a National Electricity Code, the establishment in 1996 of a central market manager, the National Electricity Market Management Company (NEMMCO), and a regulator, National Electricity Code Administrator (NECA).

Following several years experience with the new system and several controversies an energy market reform process was conducted by the Ministerial Council on Energy. As a result, beginning in 2004, a broader national arrangement, including electricity and gas and other forms of energy, was established. These arrangements are administered by a national regulator, the Australian Energy Regulator (AER), and a market rule-making body, the Australian Energy Market Commission (AEMC), and a market operator, the Australian Energy Market Operator (AEMO).

Over the 10 years from 1998–99 to 2008–09, Australia's electricity use increased at an average rate of 2.5% a year. Between 2009 and 2013 NEM energy usage had decreased by 4.3% or almost .

Coal-fired power

The main source of Australia's electricity generation is coal. In 2003, coal-fired plants produced 58.4% of the total capacity, followed by hydropower (19.1%, of which 17% is pumped storage), natural gas (13.5%), liquid/gas fossil fuel-switching plants (5.4%), oil products (2.9%), wind power (0.4%), biomass (0.2%) and solar (0.1%). In 2003, coal-fired power plants generated 77.2% of the country's total electricity production, followed by natural gas (13.8%), hydropower (7.0%), oil (1.0%), biomass (0.6%) and solar and wind combined (0.3%).

Depending on the cost of coal at the power station, the long-run marginal cost of coal-based electricity at power stations in eastern Australia is between 7 and 8 cents per kWh, which is around $79 per MWh.

Hydroelectric power

Hydroelectricity accounts for 6.5–7% of NEM electricity generation. The massive Snowy Mountains Scheme is the largest producer of hydro-electricity in eastern Victoria and southern New South Wales.

Wind power

By 2015, there were 4,187 MW of installed wind power capacity, with another 15,284 MW either being planned or under construction. In the year to October 2015, wind power accounted for 4.9% of Australia's total electricity demand and 33.7% of total renewable energy supply. As at October 2015, there were 76 wind farms in Australia, most of which had turbines from 1.5 to 3 MW.

Solar power

Solar energy is used to heat water, in addition to its role in producing electricity through photovoltaics (PV).

In 2014/15, PV accounted for 2.4% of Australia's electrical energy production. The installed PV capacity in Australia has increased 10-fold between 2009 and 2011, and quadrupled between 2011 and 2016.

Wave power
The Australian government says new technology harnessing wave energy could be important for supplying electricity to most of the country's major capital cities. The Perth Wave Energy Project near Fremantle in Western Australia operates through several submerged buoys, creating energy as they move with passing waves. The Australian government has provided more than $US600,000 in research funding for the technology developed by Carnegie, a Perth company.

Nuclear power
Jervis Bay Nuclear Power Plant was a proposed nuclear power reactor in the Jervis Bay Territory on the south coast of New South Wales. It would have been Australia's first nuclear power plant, and was the only proposal to have received serious consideration as of 2005. Some environmental studies and site works were completed, and two rounds of tenders were called and evaluated, but the Australian government decided not to proceed with the project.

Queensland introduced legislation to ban nuclear power development on 20 February 2007. Tasmania has also banned nuclear power development. Both laws were enacted in response to a pro-nuclear position, by John Howard in 2006.

John Howard went to the November 2007 election with a pro-nuclear power platform but his government was soundly defeated by Labor, which is opposed to nuclear power for Australia.

Geothermal

There are vast deep-seated granite systems, mainly in central Australia, that have high temperatures at depth and these are being drilled by 19 companies across Australia in 141 areas. They are spending A$654 million on exploration programs.  South Australia has been described as "Australia's hot rock haven" and this emissions-free and renewable energy form could provide an estimated 6.8% of Australia's baseload power needs by 2030. According to an estimate by the Centre for International Economics, Australia has enough geothermal energy to contribute electricity for 450 years.

The 2008 federal budget allocated $50 million through the Renewable Energy Fund to assist with 'proof-of-concept' projects in known geothermal areas.

Biomass
Biomass power plants use crops and other vegetative by-products to produce power similar to the way coal-fired power plants work. Another product of biomass is extracting ethanol from sugar mill by-products. The GGAP subsidies for biomass include ethanol extraction with funds of $7.4M and petrol/ethanol fuel with funds of $8.8 million. The total $16.2M subsidy is considered a renewable energy source subsidy.

Biodiesel
Biodiesel is an alternative to fossil fuel diesel that can be used in cars and other internal combustion engine vehicles. It is produced from vegetable or animal fats and is the only other type of fuel that can run in current unmodified vehicle engines. 

Subsidies given to ethanol oils totaled $15 million in 2003–2004, $44 million in 2004–2005, $76 million in 2005–2006 and $99 million in 2006–2007. The cost for establishing these subsidies were $1 million in 2005–2006 and $41 million in 2006–2007.

However, with the introduction of the Fuel Tax Bill, grants and subsidies for using biodiesel have been cut leaving the public to continue using diesel instead. The grants were cut by up to 50% by 2010–2014. Previously the grants given to users of ethanol-based biofuels were $0.38 per litre, which were reduced to $0.19 in 2010–2014.

Fossil fuels
In 2003, Australian total primary energy supply (TPES) was 112.6 million tonnes of oil equivalent (Mtoe) and total final consumption (TFC) of energy was 72.3 Mtoe.

Coal

Australia had a fixed carbon price of A$23 ($23.78) a tonne on the top 500 polluters from July 2012 to July 2014.

Australia is the fourth-largest coal producing country in the world. Newcastle is the largest coal export port in the world. In 2005, Australia mined 301 million tonnes of hard coal (which converted to at least 692.3 million tonnes of co2 emitted) and 71 million tonnes of brown coal (which converted to at least 78.1 million tonnes of co2).) Coal is mined in every state of Australia. It provides about 85% of Australia's electricity production and is Australia's largest export commodity. 75% of the coal mined in Australia is exported, mostly to eastern Asia. In 2005, Australia was the largest coal exporter in the world with 231 million tonnes of hard coal. Australian black coal exports are expected by some to increase by 2.6% per year to reach 438 million tonnes by 2029–30, but the possible introduction of emissions trading schemes in customer countries as provided for under the Kyoto protocol may affect these expectations in the medium term.

Coal mining in Australia has become more controversial because of the strong link between the effects of global warming on Australia and burning coal, including exported coal, and climate change, global warming and sea level rise. Coal mining in Australia will as a result have direct impacts on agriculture in Australia, health and natural environment including the Great Barrier Reef.

The IPCC AR4 Working Group III Report "Mitigation of Climate Change" states that under Scenario A (stabilisation at 450ppm) Annex 1 countries (including Australia) will need to reduce greenhouse gas emissions by 25% to 40% by 2020 and 80% to 95% by 2050. Many environmental groups around the world, including those represented in Australia, are taking direct action for the dramatic reduction in the use of coal as carbon capture and storage is not expected to be ready before 2020 if ever commercially viable.

Natural gas
In 2002, the Howard Government announced the finalisation of negotiations for a $25 billion contract with China for LNG. The contract was to supply 3 million tonnes of LNG a year from the North West Shelf Venture off Western Australia, and was worth between $700 million and $1 billion a year for 25 years. The members of the consortium which operates the North West Shelf Venture are Woodside Petroleum, BHP, BP, Chevron, Shell and Japan Australia LNG. The price was guaranteed not to increase until 2031, and by 2015 China was paying "one-third the price for Australian gas that Australian consumers themselves had to pay."

In 2007, there was another LNG deal with China worth $35 billion. The agreement was for the potential sale of 2 to 3 million tonnes of LNG a year for 15 to 20 years from the Browse LNG project, off Western Australia, of which Woodside is the operator. The agreement was expected to bring in total revenues of $35 billion to $45 billion.

Succeeding governments oversaw other contracts with China, Japan and South Korea, but none have required exporters to set aside supplies to meet Australia's needs. The price of LNG has historically been linked to oil prices, but the true price, costs and supply levels are presently too difficult to determine.

Santos GLNG Operations, Shell and Origin Energy are major gas producers in Australia. Australia Pacific LNG (APLNG), led by Origin Energy, is the largest producer of natural gas in eastern Australia and a major exporter of liquefied natural gas to Asia. Santos is Australia's second-largest independent oil and gas producer. According to the Australian Competition & Consumer Commission (ACCC), the demand for gas in the domestic east coast market is about 700 petajoules a year. Australia is expected to become the world's biggest LNG exporter by 2019, hurting supplies in the domestic market and driving up gas and power prices.

In 2017 the Australian government received a report from the Australian Energy Market Operator and one from the ACCC showing expected gas shortages in the east coast domestic market over the next two years. The expected gas shortfall is 54 petajoules in 2018 and 48 petajoules in 2019. The federal government considered imposing export controls on gas to ensure adequate domestic supplies. The companies agreed to make sufficient supplies available to the domestic market until the end of 2019. On 7 September Santos pledged to divert 30 petajoules of gas from its Queensland-based Gladstone LNG plant slated for export into Australia's east coast market in 2018 and 2019. On 26 October 2017, APLNG agreed to increase gas to Origin Energy by 41 petajoules over 14 months, increasing APLNG's total commitment to 186 PJ for 2018, representing almost 30% of Australian east coast domestic gas market.

The price at which these additional supplies are to be made available has not been disclosed. On 24 August 2017, Orica chief executive Alberto Calderon described gas prices in Australia as ridiculous, saying that prices in Australia were more than double of what was being paid in China or Japan, adding that Australian producers could buy gas overseas (at much lower world prices) to free up domestic gas to sell at the same profit margin.

Transport subsidies

Petrol
In the transport sector, fuel subsidies reduce petrol prices by $0.38/L. This is very significant, given current petrol prices in Australia of around $1.30/L. The acceptable petrol prices hence result in Australia's petroleum consumption at 28.9 GL every year.

According to Greenpeace, removal of this subsidy would make petrol prices rise to around $1.70/L and thus could make certain alternative fuels competitive with petroleum on cost. The 32% price increase associated with subsidy removal would be expected to correspond to an 18% reduction in petrol demand and a Greenhouse Gases emission reduction of 12.5 Mt CO2-e. The Petroleum Resource Rent Tax keeps oil prices low and encourages investment in the 'finite' supplies of oil, at the same time considering alternatives.

Diesel
The subsidies for the Oil-Diesel fuel rebate program are worth about $2 billion, which are much more than the grants devoted to renewable energy. Whilst renewable energy is out of scope at this stage, an alternative diesel–renewable hybrid system is highly recommended. If the subsidies for diesel were bounded with the renewable subsidies, remote communities could adapt hybrid electric generation systems. The Energy Grants Credit Scheme (EGCS), an off-road component is a rebate program for diesel and diesel-like fuels.

Federal Government
Australia introduced a national energy rating label in 1992. The system allows consumers to compare the energy efficiency between similar appliances.

Institutions
The responsible governmental agencies for energy policy are the Council of Australian Governments (COAG), the Ministerial Council on Energy (MCE), the Ministerial Council on Mineral and Petroleum Resources (MCMPR), the Commonwealth Department of Resources; Energy and Tourism (DRET), the Department of Environment and Heritage (DEH), the Australian Greenhouse Office (AGO), the Department of Transport and Regional Services, the Australian Competition and Consumer Commission (ACCC), the Australian Energy Market Commission, the Australian Energy Regulator and the Australian Energy Market Operator.

Energy strategy
In the 2004 White Paper Securing Australia's Energy Future, several initiatives were announced to achieve the Australian Government's energy objectives. These include:
 a complete overhaul of the fuel excise system to remove A$1.5 billion in excise liability from businesses and households in the period to 2012–13
 the establishment of a A$500 million fund to leverage more than A$1 billion in private investment to develop and demonstrate low-emission technologies
 a strong emphasis on the urgency and importance of continued energy market reform
 the provision of A$75 million for Solar Cities trials in urban areas to demonstrate a new energy scenario, bringing together the benefits of solar energy, energy efficiency and vibrant energy markets
 the provision of A$134 million to remove impediments to the commercial development of renewable technologies
 incentives for petroleum exploration in frontier offshore areas as announced in the 2004–05 budget
 New requirements for a business to manage their emissions wisely
 a requirement that larger energy users undertake, and report publicly on, regular assessments to identify energy efficiency opportunities.

Criticisms
 On a net basis this is a tax on the top 40% of income earners which will then be used largely to subsidise the coal industry in attempts to develop carbon capture and storage in Australia, clean coal.
 Deforestation is not included in the scheme where there will be reforestation despite the significant timing differences, the uncertainty of reforestation and the effect of leaving old-growth forests vulnerable.
 It is unclear what level of a carbon price will be sufficient to reduce demand for coal-fired power and increase demand for low emissions electricity like wind or solar.
 No commitment to maintain Mandatory Renewable Energy Target.
 The scheme fails to address climate change caused by burning of coal exported from Australia.

Energy market reform

On 11 December 2003, the Ministerial Council on Energy released a document entitled "Reform of Energy Markets". The overall purpose of this initiative was the creation of national electricity and natural gas markets rather than the state-based provision of both. As a result, two federal-level institutions, the Australian Energy Market Commission (AEMC) and the Australian Energy Regulator (AER), were created.

State policies

Queensland 

Queensland's energy policy is based on the year 2000 document called Queensland Energy Policy: A Cleaner Energy Strategy. The Queensland Government assists energy development through the Queensland Department of Energy and is most noted for its contribution to coal mining in Australia. Queensland was referred to by the Morison Government in 2019 as having "a specific problem," and provided a $10 million subsidy to assess the feasibility of a range of power minimisation projects.

South Australia 
The South Australian Government has developed an energy policy based on sustainability objectives as well as on South Australia's Strategic Plan.

A major priority of South Australia's Strategic Plan is to reduce greenhouse gas emissions in South Australia to achieve the Kyoto target as a first step towards reducing emissions by 60% (to 40% of 1990 levels) by 2050.

Measures announced in South Australia include:
 stabilisation of greenhouse pollution by 2020
 legislated cuts of 60% in greenhouse pollution by 2050
 legislated renewable energy target of 15% by 2014
In 2009 Premier Mike Rann announced plans to increase the State's renewable energy production target to 33% by 2020. (Letter from Energy Minister Michael O'Brien 29 April 2011)
 solar feed-in tariff
 ban on electric hot water systems.

Victoria

In 2006 Victoria became the first state to have a renewable energy target of 10% by 2016. In 2010 the target was increased to 25% by 2020.

New South Wales 
New South Wales has a renewable energy target of 20% by 2020. New South Wales had the world's most generous feed in tariff for solar power from 2010 – 2011 at A$0.60/kwh.
This 60c/kWh feed-in tariff was revoked for new customers from 27 October 2010. Those in the scheme received that feed-in tariff until 31 December 2016. New customers enter under a net feed-in tariff, in which the power is used by the consumer (and is, therefore, worth to them whatever they would have paid for that power). Excess power is exported at a lower rate (from 0c to 17c per kWh depending on supplier and state). In 2019 Scott Morrison's federal budget allocated $1.4 billion in equity to the Snowy Hydro Project as well as a complementary $56 million towards the building of the Marinus Link. In addition, The Australian Labour Party set a target to obtain 50% of its power from renewable energy sources by 2030.

Western Australia 

In some remote areas of WA, the use of fossil fuels is expensive thus making renewable energy supplies commercially competitive. Western Australia offers renewable energy subsidies including; solar heaters, Photovoltaic rebate program for installations at households, schools, factories and renewable Remote Power Generation Program of >$500,000 rebates for large off-grid systems.

Australian Capital Territory 
The ACT Government's  an integrated policy framework for managing the social, economic and environmental challenges faced by the Territory about energy production and use, was released on 28 September 2011. The policy is a continued commitment to maintaining affordable and reliable electricity and gas supply to Canberra. The policy also establishes the key objective of achieving a more sustainable energy supply as the Territory moves to carbon neutrality by 2060.

Tasmania 

Tasmania’s electricity grid is largely powered by hydroelectric generation.  While this does not directly result in greenhouse gas emissions, the environmental effects of dams proposed or built for hydroelectric generation, such as the proposed but never constructed Franklin Dam, have been hugely controversial.

Tasmania’s isolated grid was connected to the mainland via the Basslink undersea electricity transmission cable in 2005.  Tasmania is also connected to the eastern Australian gas network via the Tasmanian Gas Pipeline, commissioned in 2005.

Wood heating is also heavily used in Tasmania.

Other states
Tasmania has a concession rebate and a life support discount. The Northern Territory has similar programs.

Renewable energy targets

In 2001, the federal government introduced a Mandatory Renewable Energy Target (MRET) of 9,500 GWh of new generation, with the scheme running until at least 2020. This represents an increase of new renewable electricity generation of about 4% of Australia's total electricity generation and a doubling of renewable generation from 1997 levels. Australia's renewable energy target does not cover heating or transport energy like Europe's or China's, Australia's target is therefore equivalent to approximately 5% of all energy from renewable sources.

The Commonwealth and the states agreed in December 2007, at a Council of Australian Governments (COAG) meeting, to work together from 2008, to combine the Commonwealth scheme with the disparate state schemes, into a single national scheme. The initial report on progress and an implementation plan was considered at a March 2008 COAG meeting. In May 2008, the Productivity Commission, the government's independent research and advisory body on a range of economic, social and environmental issues, claimed the MRET would drive up energy prices and would do nothing to cut greenhouse gas emissions. The Productivity Commission submission to the climate change review, stated that energy generators have warned that big coal-fired power stations are at risk of "crashing out of the system", and leaving huge supply gaps and price spikes if the transition is not carefully managed. This forecast has been described as a joke because up to A$20 billion compensation is proposed to be paid under the Carbon Pollution Reduction Scheme. In addition, in Victoria where the highest emitting power stations are located, the state government has emergency powers enabling it to take over and run the generating assets. The final design was presented for consideration at the September 2008 COAG meeting.

On 20 August 2009, the Expanded Renewable Energy Target increased the 2020 MRET from 9,500 to 45,000 gigawatt-hours, and continued until 2030. This will ensure that renewable energy reaches a 20% share of the electricity supply in Australia by 2020. After 2020, the proposed Emissions Trading Scheme and improved efficiencies from innovation and manufacturing were expected to allow the MRET to be phased out by 2030. The target was criticised as unambitious and ineffective in reducing Australia's fossil fuel dependency, as it only applied to generated electricity, but not to the 77% of energy production exported, nor to energy sources which are not used for electricity generation, such as the oil used in transportation. Thus 20% renewable energy in electricity generation would represent less than 2% of total energy production in Australia.

Computer modelling by the National Generators Forum has signalled the price on greenhouse emissions will need to rise from $20 a tonne in 2010 to $150 a tonne by 2050 if the federal government is to deliver its promised cuts. Generators of Australia's electricity warned of blackouts and power price spikes if the federal government moved too aggressively to put a price on greenhouse emissions.

South Australia achieved its target of 20% of renewable supply by 2014 three years ahead of schedule (i.e. in 2011). In 2008 it set a new target of 33% by 2020. New South Wales and Victoria have renewable energy targets of 20% and 25% respectively by 2020. Tasmania has had 100% renewable energy for a long time.

In 2011 the 'expanded MRET' was split into two schemes: a 41,000 GWh Large-scale Renewable Energy Target (LRET) for utility-scale renewable generators, and an uncapped Small-scale Renewable Energy Scheme for small household and commercial-scale generators.

The MRET requires wholesale purchasers of electricity (such as electricity retailers or industrial operations) to purchase renewable energy certificates (RECs), created through the generation of electricity from renewable sources, including wind, hydro, landfill gas and geothermal, as well as solar PV and solar thermal. The objective is to provide a stimulus and additional revenue for these technologies. Since 1 January 2011, RECs were split into small-scale technology certificates (STCs) and large-scale generation certificates (LGCs). RECs are still used as a general term covering both STCs and LGCs.

In 2014, the Abbott Government initiated the Warburton Review and subsequently held negotiations with the Labor Opposition. In June 2015, the 2020 LRET was reduced to 33,000 GWh. This will result in more than 23.5% of Australia's electricity being derived from renewable sources by 2020. The required gigawatt-hours of renewable source electricity from 2017 to 2019 were also adjusted to reflect the new target.

Greenhouse gas emissions reduction targets
Coal is the most carbon-intensive energy source releasing the highest levels of carbon dioxide into the atmosphere.

 South Australia, legislated cuts of 60% in greenhouse pollution by 2050 and stabilisation by 2020 were announced.
 Victoria announced legislated cuts in greenhouse pollution of 60% by 2050 based on 2000 levels.
 New South Wales announced legislated cuts in greenhouse pollution of 60% by 2050 and a stabilisation target by 2025.

Low Emissions Technology Demonstration Fund (LETDF)
 $500 million – competitive grants
 $1 billion – private sector funds

Currently has funded six projects to help reduce GHG emissions, which are summarised below

82% of subsidies are concentrated in the Australian Government's 'Clean Coal Technology', with the remaining 18% of funds allocated to the renewable energy 'Project Solar Systems Australia' $75 million.
The LETDF is a new subsidy scheme aimed at fossil fuel energy production started in 2007.

Feed-in tariffs

Between 2008 and 2012 most states and territories in Australia implemented various feed-in tariff arrangements to promote uptake of renewable electricity, primarily in the form of rooftop solar PV systems. As system costs fell uptake accelerated rapidly (in conjunction with the assistance provided through the national-level Small-scale Renewable Energy Scheme (SRES)) and these schemes were progressively wound back.

Public opinion
The Australian results from the 1st Annual World Environment Review, published on 5 June 2007 revealed that:
86.4% are concerned about climate change.
88.5% think their Government should do more to tackle global warming.
79.9% think that Australia is too dependent on fossil fuels.
80.2% think that Australia is too reliant on foreign oil.
89.2% think that a minimum of 25% of electricity should be generated from renewable energy sources.
25.3% think that the Government should do more to expand nuclear power.
61.3% are concerned about nuclear power.
80.3% are concerned about carbon dioxide emissions from developing countries.
68.6% think it appropriate for developed countries to demand restrictions on carbon dioxide emissions from developing countries.

See also

 Asia-Pacific Emissions Trading Forum
 Australian Renewable Energy Agency
 Carbon capture and storage in Australia
 Effects of global warming on Australia
 Energy diplomacy
 Energy policy
 Energy in Victoria

References

Further reading
Australian Government (2007). Australian Government Renewable Energy Policies and Programs 2 pages.
New South Wales Government (2006). NSW Renewable Energy Target: Explanatory Paper 17 pages.
 The Natural Edge Project, Griffith University, ANU, CSIRO and NFEE (2008). Energy Transformed: Sustainable Energy Solutions for Climate Change Mitigation 600+ pages.
 Greenpeace Australia Pacific Energy [R]evolution Scenario: Australia, 2008 ) 47 pages.
 Beyond Zero Emissions Zero Carbon Australia 2020, 2010 

 
Public policy in Australia